Emily Gantriis (born 29 May 1999) is a Danish swimmer. She competed in the women's 4 × 100 metre freestyle relay event at the 2018 European Aquatics Championships, winning the bronze medal.

References

External links
 

1999 births
Living people
Danish female freestyle swimmers
Place of birth missing (living people)
European Aquatics Championships medalists in swimming
European Games competitors for Denmark
Swimmers at the 2015 European Games